The 2013–14 Israel State Cup (Gvia HaMedina) was the 75th season of Israel's nationwide football cup competition and the 60th after the Israeli Declaration of Independence. It began in August 2013, while the final was held in Ramat Gan Stadium on 7 May 2014.

The competition was won by Ironi Kiryat Shmona, who had beaten Maccabi Netanya 1–0 in the final. 

By winning, Ironi Kiryat Shmona qualified for the 2014–15 UEFA Europa League, entering in the third qualifying round.

Preliminary rounds

First round

Second round

Third round

The eight Liga Bet winners qualify to the sixth round.

Fourth round

Fifth round

Nationwide Rounds

Sixth round

Seventh round

The 16 winners from the previous round of the competition join 12 Liga Leumit clubs in this stage of the competition. The other 4 clubs from Liga Leumit received a bye for the next round. These matches will be played on 7 and 8 January 2014.

Round of 32

Round of 16

Quarter-finals

Semi-finals

Final

Notes

External links
 Israel Football Association website 

Israel State Cup
State Cup
Israel State Cup seasons